Aleksandra Jarecka, née Zamachowska (born 11 October 1995) is a Polish fencer. She competed in the 2020 Summer Olympics.

References

1995 births
Living people
Sportspeople from Kraków
Fencers at the 2020 Summer Olympics
Polish female fencers
Olympic fencers of Poland